JS Makishio (SS-593) is the fourth boat of the s. She was commissioned on 29 March 2001.

Construction and career
Makishio was laid down at Mitsubishi Heavy Industries Kobe Shipyard on 6 March 1996 and launched on 26 November 1998. She was commissioned on 9 March 2000 and deployed to Yokosuka.

On 6 August 2008, she left Kure for Hawaii for the major naval exercise RIMPAC 2008 and returned to Kure on 12 November.

The submarine participated in RIMPAC 2019 from 30 March to 29 June 2019, and conducted offshore training and facility use training in the Hawaiian Islands area.

Gallery

Citations

External links

1999 ships
Oyashio-class submarines
Ships built by Mitsubishi Heavy Industries